The ACC men's soccer tournament is the conference championship tournament in soccer for the Atlantic Coast Conference (ACC).  The tournament has been held every year since 1987.  It is a single-elimination tournament and seeding is based on regular season records. The winner, declared conference champion, receives the conference's automatic bid to the NCAA Division I men's soccer championship.

Champions

Key

By year

By school
Through 2022

Florida State, Georgia Tech, and Miami do not sponsor men's soccer.

Pre-tournament champions
Prior to 1987, the champion was determined based on regular season play.

References

External links